Mount Mélébingóy, formerly known as Parker Volcano, is an active volcano on Mindanao island in the Philippines.

The volcano's English name is taken from an American, General Frank Parker, who spotted the mountain and claimed to have "discovered" it during a flight he piloted in 1934. Parker led an expedition up to the lake in the mountain's crater with other US colonial and Filipino government officials, including Vice-Governor-General Joseph Ralston Hayden and Provincial Governor Gutierrez, in the fall of 1934.

Physical features

The lake, which is officially called Lake Hólón, was named after another American who was with Parker when he crashed.

Mélébingóy is considered one of the sacred places of the Tboli tribe. It hosts a rare species, Parantica dannatti reyesi, a butterfly related to the monarch, which was discovered by the late Professor Josue de los Reyes of Notre Dame of Marbel University and published in the entomological journal of Senckerburg Research Institute in December 1994.

Government officials have also confirmed sightings of the Philippine tarsier, Tarsius syrichta, which can supposedly be found in the barangays surrounding Lake Hólón.

Eruptions

Mount Parker is believed to have erupted thrice over the past 3,800 years, the last one on January 4, 1641. The 1641 eruption caused the formation of the crater lake.

On September 6, 1995, local officials reported what they believed was volcanic activity at Lake Maughan. The alleged activity caused landslides and flooding along Ga-o River that drains Lake Maughan and joins Allah River in the north. Due to this phenomenon, the Philippine Institute of Volcanology and Seismology installed monitoring equipment that established that the so-called activity was man-made.

Less than a year after the 1995 activity, a temporary dam was formed at about 250 m from the outlet of Lake Maughan, alarming the residents within the area due to fear of flash floods.

See also
 List of active volcanoes in the Philippines
 List of potentially active volcanoes in the Philippines
 List of inactive volcanoes in the Philippines

References

Stratovolcanoes of the Philippines
Subduction volcanoes
Volcanoes of Mindanao
Mountains of the Philippines
Active volcanoes of the Philippines
Landforms of South Cotabato
17th-century volcanic events